Tommy Anderson may refer to:
Tommy Anderson (rugby league) (1887–1928), Australian rugby league footballer
Tommy Anderson (footballer) (born 1934), Scottish footballer (Watford FC, Stockport County)
Tommy Anderson (ice hockey) (1910–1971), Canadian ice hockey defenseman

See also
Tommy Andersson (disambiguation)
Tom Anderson (disambiguation)
Thomas Anderson (disambiguation)